Reviews in Endocrine and Metabolic Disorders is a quarterly peer-reviewed medical review journal covering endocrinology and metabolism. It was established in 2000 with Derek LeRoith as the founding editor-in-chief. It is published by Springer Nature and the editor-in-chief is Felipe F. Casanueva (University of Santiago de Compostela). According to the Journal Citation Reports, the journal has a 2018 impact factor of 5.516.

References

External links

Endocrinology journals
Review journals
Springer Science+Business Media academic journals
English-language journals
Publications established in 2000